Marjorie Ryerson is an American editor, photographer, and politician. She represented the Orange-Washington-Addison district in the Vermont House of Representatives from 2013–2017. She is a member of the Democratic Party.

Ryerson earned her MFA at the University of Iowa Writers' Workshop. She worked as an editor and photojournalist for a publications including The Times Argus, The Boston Globe, The Burlington Free Press, and others. From 1991 until 2005 she taught photography and non-fiction writing at Castleton State College. In 2001, she was named a Vermont State Colleges Faculty Fellow. The same year she took a sabbatical to work on books. During this time, she published a photography book, Water Music, featuring her photographs of water along with quotes from musicians. In 2013, she was appointed to fill the Orange-Washington-Addison District seat in the Vermont House of Representatives vacated by the death of Larry Townsend. Her appointment made the Vermont legislature the fourth in the United States to have a majority of seats held by women. She was re-elected without opposition in 2014 and left office at the end of her term in January 2017.

References

Year of birth missing (living people)
Living people
Democratic Party members of the Vermont House of Representatives
Iowa Writers' Workshop alumni
Women state legislators in Vermont
21st-century American women